Reuven Oved (born 28 November 1983) is an Israeli former professional footballer who played as a midfielder.

He started his career at Maccabi Tel Aviv but after a few problems with the club he moved to Hapoel Haifa and after one unsuccessful season with Haifa he moved to Bnei Yehuda Tel Aviv there he spent two of his most successful seasons in his whole career. In the summer of 2007 he moved to Hapoel Tel Aviv. At the end of 2011 he moved to Grazer AK, but after one season was released from the club in September 2012.

Honours
 Israeli Premier League: 2002–03
 Israel State Cup runner-up: 2006
 Toto Cup (Leumit): 2010
 Austrian Regional League Central: 2011–12
 Liga Alef: 2013–14

External links

References

1983 births
Living people
Israeli Jews
Israeli footballers
Footballers from Giv'at Shmuel
Association football midfielders
Israeli Premier League players
Liga Leumit players
Hapoel Tel Aviv F.C. players
Bnei Yehuda Tel Aviv F.C. players
Maccabi Tel Aviv F.C. players
Maccabi Netanya F.C. players
Hapoel Petah Tikva F.C. players
Hapoel Nir Ramat HaSharon F.C. players
Hakoah Maccabi Amidar Ramat Gan F.C. players
Grazer AK players
Maccabi Kiryat Gat F.C. players
Hapoel Mahane Yehuda F.C. players
F.C. Be'er Sheva players
Israeli people of Moroccan-Jewish descent
Israeli expatriate footballers
Expatriate footballers in Austria
Israeli expatriate sportspeople  in Austria